Staphylococcus stepanovicii is a Gram-positive, coagulase-negative member of the bacterial genus Staphylococcus consisting of single, paired, and clustered cocci.  The species is novobiocin-resistant and oxidase-positive. It was named in honor of Serbian microbiologist Srdjan Stepanović.

Staphylococcus stepanovicii has been isolated from the skin of small mammals in the wild.

References

External links
Type strain of Staphylococcus stepanovicii at BacDive -  the Bacterial Diversity Metadatabase

stepanovicii
Bacteria described in 2010